Stomphastis adesa is a moth of the family Gracillariidae. It is known from Madagascar and Nigeria.

References

Stomphastis
Moths of Madagascar
Insects of West Africa
Moths of Africa